Gonzalo Emiliano Giménez (born 4 September 1995) is an Argentine professional footballer who plays as a midfielder for Almagro.

Career
Giménez made his debut for Arsenal de Sarandí after coming from the youth ranks in an Argentine Primera División match against Crucero del Norte on 1 June 2015. Five more appearances followed in all competitions for Giménez in 2016 and 2016–17 respectively between February and October 2016. In September 2017, Giménez joined Estudiantes of Primera B Metropolitana. He made his debut on 24 September in a 1–1 draw versus Colegiales. Fellow Primera B Metropolitana team Flandria signed Giménez in June 2018. In his first start, he scored his first senior goal in a win over Comunicaciones on 29 August.

In August 2020, Giménez moved up to Primera B Nacional with Almagro.

Career statistics
.

References

External links

1995 births
Living people
Sportspeople from Lanús
Argentine footballers
Association football midfielders
Argentine Primera División players
Primera B Metropolitana players
Arsenal de Sarandí footballers
Estudiantes de Buenos Aires footballers
Flandria footballers
Club Almagro players